Mainz is a German quarterly journal that publishes on cultural, political, economic, and historical aspects of the German city of Mainz. The journal was founded in 1981 by the later mayor of Mainz, . It is currently edited by Michael Bonewitz. The journal has sections on culture, city history, politics, sports, and other topics, and contains full-color illustrations.

References

External links
 Archived issues of Mainz

German-language journals
Mainz
1981 establishments in Germany
Publications established in 1981
Quarterly journals